Vigor or vigour may refer to:

Companies
 Vigor S.A., a Brazilian food company
 Vigor Industrial, an American shipbuilding, ship repair, and industrial service provider in the Pacific Northwest and Alaska
 Vigor Shipyards, four shipyards in Washington state and Oregon
 Vigor Gaming, a manufacturer of personal computers from 2004 to 2010

Vehicles
 Honda Vigor, a premium car produced from 1981 to 1995
 Vickers VR180 Vigor, a British 1950s tractor

Football clubs
 Vigor Lamezia, an Italian football club based in Lamezia Terme, Calabria
 FK Vigør, a Norwegian football club from Hellemyr, Kristiansand

People
 Vigor (name), a list of people with the surname or given name

Other uses
 Operation Vigour, a 1992 UK Royal Air Force operation – see List of Royal Air Force operations
 Vigor (software), a parody clone of vi for UNIX
 HTC Vigor, a codename for the HTC Rezound smartphone
 Vigor High School, a public school in Prichard, Alabama, United States
 Vigour (film), also called Kracht, a 1990 Dutch drama film directed by Frouke Fokkema
 Vigor (video game), a looter shooter video game by Bohemia Studios
 Vigors, special abilities in the video game BioShock Infinite

See also
 
 
 
 
 Vigors (disambiguation)
 Vigorous (disambiguation)